Paul John McGann (born 14 November 1959) is an English actor. He came to prominence for portraying Percy Toplis in the television serial The Monocled Mutineer (1986), then starred in the dark comedy Withnail and I (1987), which was a critical success and developed a cult following. McGann later became more widely known for portraying the eighth incarnation of the Doctor in the 1996 Doctor Who television film. He is also known for playing Lieutenant William Bush in the series Hornblower.

Early life
Paul John McGann was born in Liverpool on 14 November 1959, into a Roman Catholic family. His ancestors immigrated from Ireland in the mid-19th century, having left due to the Great Famine. His mother, Clare, was a teacher, and his father Joe who died in 1984 was a metallurgist. His cousin, Ritchie Routledge, was in the 1960s band The Cryin' Shames. He has an older brother, Joe, and three younger siblings: brothers Mark and Stephen and sister Clare. All three of his brothers are also actors and the four of them played brothers in the 1995 TV serial The Hanging Gale. The same year, McGann also played Grigori Potemkin in the television film Catherine the Great alongside Mark and Stephen.

McGann attended Cardinal Allen Grammar School in the Liverpool suburb of West Derby. He was 17 and working in a shoe shop when he acted on the advice of one of his teachers and successfully auditioned for a place on the acting course at the Royal Academy of Dramatic Art. In 1980, the Principal of RADA, Hugh Cruttwell, selected a scene from an adaptation of William Shakespeare's Macbeth, which McGann co-wrote with Bruce Payne, to be performed in front of Queen Elizabeth II in one of her rare visits to the academy. Kenneth Branagh performed a soliloquy from Hamlet at the same event.

Career

Early work and breakthrough
McGann's breakthrough role was in Give Us a Break, devised by Geoff McQueen, McGann played a good snooker player who got into scrapes with Robert Lindsay, who played his wideboy manager. The series was a comedy drama in the vein of the popular ITV series of the time, Minder. The series only lasted for one season and it was concluded by a one-off special. His first major dramatic role was the British World War I deserter and criminal Percy Toplis in the 1986 BBC serial The Monocled Mutineer. The film was based on the 1978 book of the same name, written by William Alison and John Fairley.

The serial garnered controversy from British right-wing media, though McGann's performance garnered acclaim. In 1986, he was cast as the anonymous main character (Marwood) in Bruce Robinson's cult film, Withnail and I. He also starred as Anton Skrebensky in Ken Russell's 1989 adaptation of D.H. Lawrence's The Rainbow. McGann's other early film appearances include The Monk, Dealers, Tree of Hands and the epic war film Empire of the Sun. McGann and other young British actors who were becoming established film actors such as Tim Roth, Gary Oldman, Colin Firth and Bruce Payne were dubbed the 'Brit Pack'.

Since 1989, McGann has concentrated primarily on television work, including Nice Town and Nature Boy for the BBC, and The One That Got Away and the second series of Hornblower for ITV. However, he has had small roles in a number of high-profile American films like The Three Musketeers and Alien 3. His role in Alien 3 was originally larger, but much of it was edited out of the final print. The cut footage can be seen in the extended version of the film.

In 1992, he was cast as Richard Sharpe, the lead character in the Sharpe series of made-for-TV films based on Bernard Cornwell's novels; however he injured his knee while playing football just days into filming Sharpe's Rifles in Ukraine. He was replaced by Sean Bean and the role effectively kick-started Bean's career and is the one that he is most closely identified with.

Doctor Who
McGann played the eighth incarnation of the Doctor, in the Doctor Who 1996 television film.  The television film also starred Eric Roberts, Daphne Ashbrook and featured the outgoing Seventh Doctor, Sylvester McCoy.  McGann's brother, Mark McGann, also auditioned for the title role.

The Doctor Who television film was a joint venture between the BBC, Universal Studios and the Fox Broadcasting Network.  McGann had signed a contract to appear as the Eighth Doctor in a new Doctor Who television series, if Fox or Universal exercised their option.  Thus, the television film was supposed to be a "back door pilot" in that, if it obtained respectable ratings, the new series would continue to be produced. The film was shown on 14 May 1996 in the US and on 27 May 1996 in the UK.  Although it had 9.08 million viewers and was very successful in the UK, ratings were very low in the United States.  As a consequence, Fox did not exercise its option to pick up the series and Universal could not find another network interested in airing a new Doctor Who series.  Thus no new series was produced until 2005, after all the contractual rights had returned to the BBC.

McGann gave permission for his likeness to be used on the covers of the BBC's Eighth Doctor novels and he has reprised the role of the Eighth Doctor in an extensive series of audio plays by Big Finish Productions. A number of these plays have also been broadcast on BBC Radio 7 (later BBC Radio 4 Extra).

Rumours abounded that McGann would reprise the role of the Eighth Doctor in a new series of television films, alongside the current television series. McGann has denied these rumours on the grounds of not having been asked back to play the part, but if he were to be asked, would be interested as long as he "didn't have to wear a wig".

After months of speculation, on 14 November 2013 (coincidentally McGann's birthday), as part of the show's 50th Anniversary celebrations, McGann finally reprised his role as the Eighth Doctor, in the mini-episode "The Night of the Doctor". In this appearance his incarnation of the Doctor finally regenerates, 17 years after his first television appearance, into a previously unknown Doctor played by John Hurt.

Also in November 2013, McGann briefly appeared in the 50th anniversary comedy homage The Five(ish) Doctors Reboot.

He made his first appearance on the main television series in a cameo in the 2022 special "The Power of the Doctor", alongside other past Doctors. He also featured in the documentary film Doctor Who Am I, supporting TV movie director Matthew Jacobs' embrace of the Doctor Who fandom and its conventions.

Later career
In the years following his appearance as the Doctor, McGann continued to diversify his acting portfolio with the television and film roles he accepted.  In 1997 he appeared as a concerned father in the film FairyTale: A True Story and later that same year as Rob in Downtime, then in 1998 he appeared as Capt. Greville in The Dance of Shiva.

In the 2000s McGann's film appearances began to increase with films like My Kingdom (2001), Listening (2003) and Gypo (2005). Perhaps his most iconic role since Doctor Who came in 2002, when McGann appeared in the film adaptation of the third story from Anne Rice's The Vampire Chronicles, Queen of the Damned. McGann played the part of David Talbot, a member of the secret organisation the Talamasca, which researches and investigates the supernatural. Talbot has appeared in many of Rice's novels and has become a central character over the years. The film also starred Stuart Townsend, Marguerite Moreau and R&B singer Aaliyah. McGann has also been in demand for voice-over work in Britain in recent years, particularly on television documentaries and commercials.

He also gained acclaim for his portrayal of William Bush in the final four instalments of the ITV/A&E television series Hornblower, based on the Horatio Hornblower books by C.S. Forrester. He initially appears in the 2001 episode "Mutiny", with Bush being the 2nd Lieutenant of HMS Renown (and Hornblower's superior). In the 7th episode, "Loyalty", he agrees to join Hornblower as his 1st Lieutenant when Hornblower takes command of HMS Hotspur. McGann again portrays Bush in the 2003 finale of the series, "Duty".

In 2006, he appeared in the television drama Tripping Over. In 2007, McGann starred alongside Dervla Kirwan, Lorraine Ashbourne and David Bradley in BBC One drama True Dare Kiss, written by Debbie Horsfield. In 2010, McGann played a major role in a feature-length episode of long-running BBC mystery series Jonathan Creek, as well as appearing as a regular in the crime drama Luther. In 2011, McGann played a major role as an Assistant Commissioner with something to hide in the final episode of Waking the Dead and also featured in Simon Gray's Butley alongside Dominic West at the Duchess Theatre in London.

In 2017, McGann joined the cast of the long-running BBC series Holby City, playing neurosurgeon John Gaskell. In 2021, he hosted the British Podcast Awards Gold-winning Noiser podcast production Real Dictators, a history show about the up to date facts on dictators of the past.

Audio books and voice work
McGann is also known for audiobook narration having read several Pat Barker and Bernard Cornwell novels. He narrated the abridged audiobook of Jeff Noon's 1993 cyberpunk classic Vurt.

McGann continues to play the Eighth Doctor on audio. McGann's first Big Finish audio play appearance was in 2001 in the story Storm Warning. It was through the Big Finish audio plays that McGann's Doctor faced many classic Doctor Who villains like the Daleks (in various different audio plays, the first of which being The Time of the Daleks) and the Cybermen (first encountered by the Eighth Doctor on audio in Sword of Orion).

Five Eighth Doctor dramas were broadcast in BBC 7's The 7th Dimension slot between August 2005 and January 2006. They were in release order, starting with Storm Warning, although Minuet in Hell was judged unsuitable for the timeslot, and skipped. Two more Eighth Doctor audios, Shada and The Chimes of Midnight were broadcast in December 2005 and January 2006; all six of these stories were rebroadcast on BBC7 beginning in July 2006. In 2007 and 2008, a series of audio plays starring McGann as the Eighth Doctor and Sheridan Smith as companion Lucie Miller was broadcast on BBC7.

His voice also featured in the 1997 video game Ceremony of Innocence, together with those of Isabella Rossellini and Ben Kingsley.

After hearing him sing in The Monocled Mutineer, composer Bernard J. Taylor invited McGann to create the role of Benedict in the concept studio recording of the Much Ado, a musical based on Shakespeare's Much Ado About Nothing.

McGann portrayed Ambassador Durian in The Minister of Chance, a fantasy audio drama released in six parts from 2011 to 2013. The series is a spin-off of the Doctor Who audio drama Death Comes to Time, but has no official connection to the franchise. In February 2014, a crowdfunded short film based on the first instalment of The Minister of Chance was released to those who had helped fund it.

McGann portrays antagonist Noah Shackleton in the audio drama adaptation of The Phoenix Files. The Australian production is the largest audio drama ever produced in Australia with a cast of 42 actors. McGann appears in all three instalments of the science-fiction dystopian thriller series.

McGann has done audio narration for BBC documentaries, including the 2014 BBC Scotland production, Apples, Pears and Paint: How to Make a Still Life Painting.

McGann is chief narrator in the popular A short history of… podcast series, which explores various historical topics in easily accessible episodes.

Personal life
McGann is married to Annie Milner, although they are separated. They have two sons: music producer Joseph and voice actor Jake.

Filmography

Film

Television

Stage

Narration

Audio

Video games

Awards and nominations

References

External links

 
 
 Talking Shop: Paul McGann interview at the BBC News website

1959 births
Male actors from Liverpool
Alumni of RADA
Audiobook narrators
English male film actors
English male television actors
Living people
20th-century English male actors
21st-century English male actors
English people of Irish descent
Paul